(also known as Hideo Nakagami) (May 10, 1918 – April 26, 1997) was a Japanese baseball pitcher. He holds the Japanese records for lowest career ERA (1.90) and seasonal ERA (0.73), as well as best all-time winning percentage (.697). During his career, which spanned the one-league and two-league era, he played for the Tokyo Kyojin/Yomiuri Giants and the Chunichi Dragons. He was the player-manager of the Giants in 1944 and part of 1946 (the league cancelled all games in 1945 because of the Pacific War).

Biography
Fujimoto, born as Lee Pal-ryong, was born in Busan, Korea which was part of Japanese Empire at that time, moving to Japan at age eight. He attended Shimonoseki Shogyo High School and Meiji University.

In 1943, he enjoyed one of the greatest seasons ever by a pitcher in Japan, winning the pitching triple crown. He won 34 games for the Kyojin, leading the league in wins, complete games (39), innings and strikeouts (253). He threw a Japanese-record 19 shutouts and set the single-season mark for ERA at 0.73. In May 1943 he also pitched his first no-hitter, defeating Nagoya. Between August and September he threw a record six straight shutouts, going  innings without allowing a run, and 100 innings without allowing an earned run.

In 1944, in addition to pitching and managing, Nakagami occasionally played outfield. (He also spent significant time in the outfield in 1948.) Nakagami was a good hitter for someone who primarily played pitcher, hitting .245 with 15 career home runs (including 7 round-trippers in 1950).  In 1946, Nakagami led the Japanese Baseball League in earned run average, with a mark of 2.11.  Nakagami played for the Chunichi Dragons for one season in 1947, winning 17 games with a 1.83 ERA and 27 complete games. In 1949, Nakagami went 24-7 with a 1.94 ERA and 29 complete games, winning the ERA title and the Eiji Sawamura Award.

At Aomori Stadium, in  he pitched the first perfect game in NPB history.  He was the winning pitcher in games 1 and 5 (the clinching game) in the 1951 Japan Series, as the Giants beats the Nankai Hawks 4-games-to-1. He picked up a win the 1952 Japan Series (as well as hitting a home run) as the Giants were again champions, defeating the Hawks 4-games-to-2. Nakagami won another game in the 1953 Japan Series, as the Giants defeated the Hawks for the championship for the third year in a row.

After his playing career, he coached for the Giants and managed in the Japanese minor leagues, Later, he managed in the industrial leagues. He also worked as the Los Angeles correspondent for Yomiuri Shimbun.

Fujimoto/Nakagami was elected to the Japanese Baseball Hall of Fame in 1976.

References

External links

1918 births
1997 deaths
Japanese baseball players
Nippon Professional Baseball pitchers
Yomiuri Giants players
Chunichi Dragons players
Managers of baseball teams in Japan
Baseball player-managers
Yomiuri Giants managers
Korean emigrants to Japan
Nippon Professional Baseball pitchers who have pitched a perfect game
Japanese Baseball Hall of Fame inductees